Nyma or NYMA may refer to:

People
 Nyma Akashat Zibiri, Nigerian lawyer and television host
 Nyma Tang, American beauty vlogger

Other
 New York Military Academy